Devanagari is a Unicode block containing characters for writing languages such as Hindi, Marathi, Bodo, Maithili, Sindhi, Nepali, and Sanskrit, among others. In its original incarnation, the code points U+0900..U+0954 were a direct copy of the characters A0-F4 from the 1988 ISCII standard. The Bengali, Gurmukhi, Gujarati, Oriya, Tamil, Telugu, Kannada, and Malayalam blocks were similarly all based on their ISCII encodings.

Block

History
The following Unicode-related documents record the purpose and process of defining specific characters in the Devanagari block:

See also 
Devanagari in Unicode

References 

Unicode blocks